Platycephala is a genus of flies in the family Chloropidae.

Species
P. brevis An & Yang, 2008
P. elongata An & Yang, 2008
P. guangdongensis An & Yang, 2008
P. guangxiensis An & Yang, 2004
P. isinensis Kubík & Barták, 2008
P. planifrons (Fabricius, 1798)
P. rugosa (Nartshuk, 1964)
P. sichuanensis Yang & Yang, 1997
P. umbraculata (Fabricius, 1794)
P. xui An & Yang, 2008

References

Chloropinae
Chloropidae genera